The Hoag Classic (formerly the Toshiba Classic) is a golf tournament on the PGA Tour Champions. The Hoag Classic is played annually in March in Newport Beach, California at the Newport Beach Country Club. Newport Beach Country Club was designed by William Francis Bell in 1954.  The tournament was founded in 1995 as the Toshiba Senior Classic.  Hoag became the title sponsor of the tournament starting in 2019.

The longest sudden-death playoff in the history of the PGA Tour Champions occurred at the 1997 event when Bob Murphy defeated Jay Sigel on the ninth hole. The record was broken the following year at the Royal Caribbean Classic.

Winners

Multiple winners
Three players have won this tournament more than once through 2020.
2 wins
Hale Irwin: 1998, 2002
Fred Couples: 2010, 2014
Jay Haas: 2007, 2016

Notes

References

External links

Coverage on the PGA Tour Champions's official site

PGA Tour Champions events
Golf in California
Sports competitions in California
Sports in Newport Beach, California
Tourist attractions in Orange County, California
Toshiba
Recurring sporting events established in 1995
1995 establishments in California